The U.S. state of Maine has twenty-nine accredited, degree-granting institutions of higher learning. The state's land-grant university and only research university is the University of Maine in Orono. It is the flagship of the University of Maine System, which also has branch campuses in Augusta, Portland/Gorham/Lewiston, Farmington, Fort Kent, Machias, and Presque Isle. Maine's public education system also includes the Maine Community College System, comprising seven schools, and the Maine Maritime Academy.

The state's three oldest institutions of higher education are Bowdoin College (founded in 1794), Colby College (1813), and Bates College (1855). The three colleges collectively form the Colby-Bates-Bowdoin Consortium and are ranked among the best colleges in the United States; often placing in the top 10 percent of all liberal arts colleges.

The largest institution in the state is the private University of New England, with 13,439 students. The smallest, with 79 students, is The Landing School, an institution focused on boat building. UMaine is home to the state's only NCAA Division I athletic program, the Maine Black Bears. The collegiate system of Maine also includes numerous baccalaureate colleges such as Husson University, Unity College, and Thomas College. There is only one medical school in the state, the University of New England's College of Osteopathic Medicine, and only one law school, the University of Maine School of Law.

Open institutions

Defunct institutions

Out-of-state institutions
 Purdue University Global, formerly Kaplan University, part of the Indiana-based Purdue University system, has two campuses in Augusta and Lewiston, which partly trace back to the formerly independent Andover College.
 Southern New Hampshire University offers degree programs at a facility in Brunswick.

Unaccredited institutions
A few schools are recognized by the state as degree-granting institutions, but not have been accredited by a recognized accrediting body:

 Heartwood College of Art — Biddeford
 Maine Media College — Rockport
 New England Bible College — South Portland

See also
 List of college athletic programs in Maine
 Higher education in the United States
 Lists of American institutions of higher education
 Education in Maine

References
General

Specific

Notes

External links
Department of Education listing of accredited institutions in Maine

Maine
Universities and colleges